Maimonides' rule is named after the 12th-century rabbinic scholar Maimonides, who identified a correlation between class size and students' achievements. Today this rule is widely used in educational research to evaluate the effect of class size on students' test scores. Maimonides' rule states that a class size may rise to an upper limit of 40 students. Once this quota is reached the class is cut in half, so instead of one class with forty-one students there are now two classes: one with twenty students and one with twenty-one students.

Joshua Angrist and Victor Lavy (1999) have used "the nonlinear relationship between the local number of students and the class size predicted by Maimonides' rule to estimate the impact of class size on student performance, and evaluate the effect of being just below the number of students for whom an additional teacher would be brought up, and of being just above this number."

Their results have shown highly irregular patterns in class size that are precisely mirrored in student achievement. They have found that a reduction in predicted class size of ten students is associated with a 0.25 standard deviation increase in fifth-graders' test scores.

Bibliography

Rules
Educational psychology
Rule